The Florida attorney general is an elected cabinet official in the U.S. state of Florida. The attorney general serves as the chief legal officer of the state, and is head of the Florida Department of Legal Affairs.

The office is one of Florida's three elected state cabinet posts, along with the chief financial officer and agriculture commissioner. The current attorney general is Republican Ashley Moody, who took office on January 8, 2019.

Election and terms of office 
As with other elected statewide offices in Florida, the attorney general is limited to serving two consecutive four-year terms.

The attorney general appoints the Florida solicitor general who serves at his or her pleasure. The current solicitor is Amit Agarwal.

The attorney general is second (behind the lieutenant governor) in the line of succession to the office of Governor of Florida.

Removal from office 
The Florida attorney general can be impeached for committing a "misdemeanor in office" by the State House of Representatives, and then convicted and thereby removed from office by a two-thirds vote of the State Senate.

List of Florida attorneys general

See also 
Constitution of Florida
Florida Cabinet
Florida Democratic Party
Republican Party of Florida

References

External links 
 Florida Attorney General official website
 Florida Attorney General articles at ABA Journal
 News and Commentary at FindLaw
 Florida Statutes at Law.Justia.com
 U.S. Supreme Court Opinions - "Cases with title containing: State of Florida" at FindLaw
 The Florida Bar
 Florida Attorney General Pam Bondi profile at National Association of Attorneys General
 Press releases at Florida Attorney General's office